A Deadly Adoption is a 2015 American made-for-television satirical thriller-drama film directed by Rachel Lee Goldenberg (in her feature directories debut) and written by Andrew Steele. It meant to be a straight-faced lampoon of Lifetime Network's original content. It stars Will Ferrell and Kristen Wiig as a typical middle-class husband and wife, with Jessica Lowndes serving as the agenda-driven villain.

The film aired on Lifetime on June 20, 2015.

Plot
Organic food vendor Sarah Benson and her best-selling author and finance guru husband Robert are parents to one-year-old daughter Sully. Sarah is pregnant with their second child.

During Sully's first birthday, Sarah wants Robert to take her on a boat ride on Storm Lake behind their home. As she leans against the dock railing, it breaks and she is knocked unconscious on the boat as she falls into the water. Robert resuscitates her but she loses the baby, and they can no longer have children.

Five years later, Robert is a recluse, but has managed six months sober following an alcohol addiction beginning with the loss of their baby. He is struggling for inspiration for the book he is writing, and is over-protective of six-year old type 1 diabetic Sully.

Robert and Sarah plan to adopt an unwanted child and find the young and attractive Bridgette Gibson living in a homeless shelter in the final months of her pregnancy. They offer her the bedroom they had built for their lost child. Once alone in the room, she pulls out a magazine with the Bensons on the front cover and rips off the half containing Sarah.

Sully sees through Bridgette's cracked bathroom door as she's showering that her enlarged belly is fake. Bridgette explains that she was worried the Bensons wouldn't believe she was pregnant because of her slender build. Sully agrees to keep her secret. Bridgette removes the training wheels from Sully's bike without Robert's knowledge and pushes her down the driveway where she's almost struck by a car. She steers into the path of Dwayne Tisdale, Bridgette's tattooed hoodlum boyfriend. Bridgette persuades Sully to keep this a secret as well.

Robert finds a copy of one of his books among Bridgette's belongings. Inside the front cover is his autograph to "Joni". He realizes Bridgette is Joni, a fan with whom he slept in the depths of his alcoholism. When Sully goes missing the police confirm Bridgette's identity.

Bridgette and Dwayne take Sully to their cabin across the lake, where Dwayne believes Bridgette is with him in a ransom plot. But Bridgette's agenda is to kill Sarah and have Robert and Sully for herself. Sarah's employee Charlie, suspicious of Bridgette, follows them and is shot dead by Dwayne.

When Sully falls ill from not having insulin, Bridgette confronts Robert and Sarah. A struggle breaks out and Bridgette overpowers Sarah and shoots Robert in the shoulder. She sets Sarah in her running car in the garage to look like a suicide attempt. Robert regains consciousness and moves Sarah to fresh air.

Driving Dwayne's truck with Sully next to her, Bridgette comes upon Robert standing in the middle of a bridge. Robert dives out of the way just in time. Bridgette stops and aims her gun at him as Sully jumps out and runs to Robert. Bridgette orders Sully to return or she will kill Robert. He whispers in Sully's ear as she turns back to Bridgette. Sully darts to the bridge's edge and dives off. Bridgette shifts her gaze and Robert dives after Sully as Bridgette fires her pistol. Bridgette looks down at Robert and Sully climbing into a small boat and frantically trying to start the outboard motor. Bridgette gets ready to pull the trigger, when a shot rings out and Bridgette is struck. The shot is from a gun held by Sarah, having regained consciousness and followed her family. Bridgette falls to her death in the water below.

Six months later, the Benson family is restored and intact. Robert and Sarah dance in the kitchen with their daughter.

Cast
 Will Ferrell as Robert Benson
 Kristen Wiig as Sarah Benson
 Jessica Lowndes as Bridgette Gibson/Joni Mathers
 Alyvia Alyn Lind as Sully Benson
 Jake Weary as Dwayne Tisdale
 Erik Palladino as Sheriff J. Moore
 Bryan Safi as Charlie
 Debra Christofferson as Ellen Macy
 Carolyn Hennesy as Debby
 Kellita Smith as Officer F. Mason
 Matt Corboy as Stan
 Brooke Lyons as Christine

Production
On April 1, 2015, it was revealed that Will Ferrell, Kristen Wiig, and Jessica Lowndes were set to star in the film as a parody of the genre of Lifetime films, with Rachel Lee Goldenberg directing and Andrew Steele writing the screenplay. Adam McKay's production company Gary Sanchez Productions and Ferrell are executive producing. The next day, Ferrell issued a statement regarding the film saying "We are deeply disappointed that our planned top-secret project was made public, Kristen and I have decided it is in the best interest for everyone to forgo the project entirely, and we thank Lifetime and all the people who were ready to help us make this film." shooting down the prospect of the film being released. However, in June 2015, a billboard for the film was spotted with a release date of June 20, 2015.

The premiere of the film coincides with the 25th anniversary of Lifetime's movie franchise.

According to James Franco, Ferrell revealed to him that he was inspired to do the project by Franco's guest starring stint on General Hospital. Franco would go on to say that Ferrell performing in the movie inspired him to helm a remake of the 1996 movie, Mother, May I Sleep with Danger?

Reception

Joshua Alston of The A.V. Club gave the film a B−, commenting on the straight dramatic acting by the principals, "Everything about Adoption is right visually, and Ferrell and Wiig are close enough to where they should be tonally, but it’s all a bit too earnest."

In an interview with Conan O'Brien, Ferrell explains that the joke lay in the absurdity of producing a straight Lifetime movie. Ferrell cites Rolling Stone, which Ferrell claimed understood the joke, while The New York Times had not.

See also
 List of films featuring diabetes

References

External links
 
 

2015 television films
2015 films
2015 thriller drama films
Lifetime (TV network) films
Films about adoption
Films about families
Films about child abduction in the United States
American pregnancy films
American thriller drama films
Gary Sanchez Productions films
American drama television films
2010s American films